USCGC Matagorda has been the name of more than one United States Coast Guard ship, and may refer to:

, later WHEC-373, a cutter in commission from 1949 to 1967
, a patrol boat decommissioned after a failed Deepwater re-fit

United States Coast Guard ship names